Pedro Bettencourt Ávila (born Porto, 18 November 1994) is a Portuguese rugby union player. His usual position is as a centre.

Club career
He played for Lusitanos XV, in Portugal, in 2013/14. He played for Clermont (2014/15-2015/16) and for Carcassonne (2016/17-2017/18). He played for Newcastle Falcons in 2018/19. He plays for Oyonnax Rugby since 2019/20.

International career
He has 22 caps for Portugal, since 2013, with 4 tries, 7 conversions and 22 penalties scored, 100 points on aggregate. He had his first cap at the 36-13 loss to Fiji, at 9 November 2013, in Lisbon, in a tour, aged 19 years old.

References

External links
itsrugby.co.uk Profile

1994 births
Living people
Sportspeople from Porto
Portuguese rugby union players
Portugal international rugby union players
Rugby union centres
US Carcassonne players
Oyonnax Rugby players